A Quiet Little Marriage is a 2008 drama film directed by Mo Perkins and written by Perkins, Mary Elizabeth Ellis and Cy Carter. It also stars Ellis and Carter.

Cast
Mary Elizabeth Ellis as Olive
Cy Carter as Dax
Jimmi Simpson as Jackson
Michael O'Neill as Bruce
Charlie Day as Adam
Melanie Lynskey as Monique
Lucy DeVito as Silvia

Production
The film was produced by Hal Haberman, with cinematography by Eric Zimmerman; music by David Lux; and edited by Julia Gandelsonas.

Distribution
It was distributed by IFC Films.

Awards
The film won the Best Narrative Feature award at the 2009 Slamdance Film Festival.

References

External links
 
 

2008 films
2008 drama films
2000s English-language films